20 Jahre – Live in Frankfurt is the fourth live album by German rock band Böhse Onkelz. It was recorded on 3 March 2001 at the Festhalle  Frankfurt. The concert should have taken place on 25 November 2000, the 20th anniversary of the Böhse Onkelz. It had to be moved because singer Kevin Russell had a car accident a few days before the concert.

The DVD was the worldwide first live album which supports Dolby Digital Surround EX (6.1).

Track listing

DVD 1
 Intro/Festhallenjam
 10/20 Jahre (10/20 Years)
 Wilde Jungs (Wild boys)
 Dick und durstig (Fat and thirsty)
 Falsche Propheten (False prophets)
 Stöckel und Strapse (Stilettos and garters)
 Bomberpilot (Bomber pilot)
 So sind wir (That's how we are)
 Ich lieb' mich (I love myself)
 Heute trinken wir richtig (We're getting wasted tonight)
 Heilige Lieder (Holy songs)
 Finde die Wahrheit (Find the truth)
 Onkelz 2000
 Ich (I)
 Ein langer Weg ( A long way)

DVD 2
 Benutz mich (Use me)
 Wieder mal 'nen Tag verschenkt (Another day wasted)
 Danke für nichts (Thanks for nothing)
 Nichts ist für die Ewigkeit (Nothing lasts forever)
 Paradies (Paradise)
 Terpentin (Turpentine)
 Wir ham' noch lange nicht genug (We're not done yet)
 Mexico
 Erinnerungen (Memories)

CD 1
 10/20 Jahre
 Wilde Jungs
 Dick und durstig
 Falsche Propheten
 Stöckel und Strapse
 Bomberpilot
 So sind wir
 Ich lieb' mich
 Heute trinken wir richtig
 Alkohol (Live-Mix/Festhallenchor)
 Oratorium
 Heilige Lieder
 Finde die Wahrheit
 Onkelz 2000
 Ich
 Ein langer Weg

CD 2
 Benutz mich
 Wieder mal 'nen Tag verschenkt
 Danke für nichts
 Nichts ist für die Ewigkeit
 Paradies
 Terpentin
 Wir ham' noch lange nicht genug
 Mexico
 Erinnerungen
 Festhallenjam (Bonus)
 Alkohol (Bonus-Mix/Festhallenchor)

References 

Böhse Onkelz live albums
2001 live albums
2001 video albums
Live video albums
German-language live albums
German-language video albums
Böhse Onkelz video albums